3C 79 is a Seyfert Galaxy located in the constellation Aries.  The extended emission-line region (EELR) is almost certainly photoionized by the hidden quasar.

References

External links
 www.jb.man.ac.uk/atlas/ (J. P. Leahy)
 Wikisky image of PGC 1524618

079
Radio galaxies
3C 79
Aries (constellation)
Seyfert galaxies